Giacomo Sarcuni (1690-1758) was a Neapolitan composer.

Recordings
Missa a 5 voci con stromenti. Horrida pavet specus frangitur; In Monte Oliveti .  La Hispanoflamenca, Le Pavillon de Musique, Ben van Nespen, Etcetera 2022

References

1690 births
1758 deaths